Il siluramento dell'Oceania is a 1917 Italian film directed by Augusto Genina.

Cast
Alfredo Boccolini
Cecyl Tryan
Ileana Leonidoff
Oreste Bilancia
Vasco Creti
Pietro Pesci
Armando Pilotti

External links

1917 films
Italian silent films
Films directed by Augusto Genina
Italian black-and-white films